Faruk Čaklovica (born 1953 in Zvornik, Bosnia and Herzegovina) is a Bosnian Professor of Bromatology and former Rector of the University of Sarajevo. He is member of the board at the Balkan Universities Network 2010.

Biography
Čaklovica received his BSci in veterinary medicine from the Faculty of Veterinary Medicine at the Sarajevo University in 1977, his MSci and Doctorate from the same Faculty in 1983 and 1987.

Čaklovica attended post-doctoral studies in United States (1987), Denmark (1989), Malaysia (1996), Egypt (1999) and Germany (1999).

In 2001, Čaklovica took up the post of the Dean of the Faculty of Veterinary Medicine at the Sarajevo University until 2006, when he was appointed as the Rector of the Sarajevo University. Čaklovica authored and co-authored 143 scientific and expert papers in the areas of applied micro biology of food, bacteria diseases transferable by food, human nutrition, hygiene and technology of food.

Čaklovica is married and has one child.

References

1953 births
Living people
Bosniaks of Bosnia and Herzegovina
People from Zvornik